The Borzya ( from Mongolian "Боорж/Boorj") is a river in Zabaykalsky Krai, Russia. The town of Borzya lies along the river. It is a right tributary of the Onon (in Amur's basin).

In 1918, multiple Communists unsuccessfully attempted to destroy the bridge over the Borzya. However, the plan failed due to weather conditions.

Geography 
The Borzya has its sources in the Kukulbey Mountains. It flows through a wide, swampy valley in a steppe landscape. The river's waters comes mainly from rain, and there are periodic flooding in the summer. The river sometimes dries up completely.

References 

Rivers of Zabaykalsky Krai